Daveri Hill (‘Halm Daveri’ \'h&lm 'da-ve-ri\) is the ice-covered hill rising to 834 m at the northeast extremity of Srednogorie Heights on Trinity Peninsula in Graham Land, Antarctica.  It is surmounting Malorad Glacier to the north.

The hill is named after the settlements of Daveri in Northern Bulgaria.

Location
German-British mapping in 1996.

Maps
 Trinity Peninsula. Scale 1:250000 topographic map No. 5697. Institut für Angewandte Geodäsie and British Antarctic Survey, 1996.
 Antarctic Digital Database (ADD). Scale 1:250000 topographic map of Antarctica. Scientific Committee on Antarctic Research (SCAR), 1993–2016.

References
 Daveri Hill. SCAR Composite Antarctic Gazetteer
 Bulgarian Antarctic Gazetteer. Antarctic Place-names Commission. (details in Bulgarian, basic data in English)

External links
 Daveri Hill. Copernix satellite image

Hills of Trinity Peninsula
Bulgaria and the Antarctic